James Patterson (born 1947) is an American author.

James or Jim Patterson may also refer to:

Politicians 
 James Patterson (New Jersey politician) (1794–1867), American Democratic Party politician from New Jersey
 James Patterson (Australian politician) (1833–1895), Australian colonial politician, 17th Premier of Victoria
 James W. Patterson (1823–1893), United States Senator from New Hampshire
 James Colebrooke Patterson (1839–1929), Canadian politician
 James O. Patterson (1857–1911), U.S. Representative from South Carolina
 James T. Patterson (politician) (1908–1989), U.S. Representative from Connecticut
 J. O. Patterson Jr. (James Oglethorpe Patterson, 1935–2011), American bishop and mayor of Memphis, Tennessee
 Jim Patterson (California politician) (born 1948), member of California State Assembly since 2012
 Jim Patterson (Alabama politician) (1950–2017), U.S. representative from Alabama

Sport 
 Jim Patterson (Scottish footballer) (?–2012), record goal scorer with Scottish club, Queen of the South
 Jim Patterson (cricketer) (born 1959), Irish cricketer
 Jim Patterson (Australian footballer) (1919–1994), Australian rules footballer
 Jim Patterson Stadium, baseball stadium in Louisville named for the founder of Long John Silvers, Kentucky, opened in 2005

Writers 
 James Lloydovich Patterson (born 1933), Russian writer of African-American descent
 James T. Patterson (historian) (born 1935), American historian
 Jim Patterson (screenwriter) (fl. 2010s–2020s), American producer and screenwriter

Others 
 James Kennedy Patterson (1833–1922), Scottish-American academic administrator
 James John Patterson (1859–1937), New Zealand blacksmith, farmer and landowner
 James Joseph Patterson (1923–1992), American newspaper executive
 James Laird Patterson (1822–1902), British Roman Catholic bishop
 James Patterson (actor) (1932–1972), American actor
 Jimmy Patterson, the main character of Medal of Honor video game series
 "Big" Jim Paterson (fl. 1970s–2020s), trombonist of Dexys Midnight Runners

See also
 Big Jim Patterson (disambiguation)
 James Paterson (disambiguation)
 Jamie Patterson (disambiguation)